John McElroy (1846–1929) was an American printer, soldier, journalist and author, known mainly for writing the novel The Red Acorn and the four-volume Andersonville: A Story of Rebel Military Prisons, based upon his lengthy confinement in the Confederate Andersonville prison camp during the American Civil War.

Biography
McElroy was born to Robert and Mary Henderson McElroy in Greenup County, Kentucky. When his father died, he traveled to St. Louis to become an apprentice in the printing business.

As a sixteen-year-old in 1863, McElroy enlisted with the Union Army as a private in Company L of the 16th Illinois Cavalry regiment, having earlier served with local Union troops in operations near St. Louis. In January 1864, he was among dozens of men captured in a skirmish near Jonesville, Virginia, by Confederate cavalrymen commanded by William E. Jones. According to his book, Andersonville: A Story of Rebel Military Prisons, McElroy was first sent to Richmond, then to Andersonville in February 1864. In October 1864 he was moved to Savannah and within about six weeks was sent to the new prison in Millen, Georgia (Camp Lawton); thence to several other camps before the war ended.

After the war ended, McElroy was released from captivity and transported back to the North. He settled in Chicago and resumed the printer's trade. He became a local reporter and newspaperman before relocating to Toledo, Ohio, to become an editor of the Toledo Blade. He married Elsie Pomeroy of Ottawa, Ohio, and raised a family. In 1879, he wrote Andersonville: A Story of Rebel Military Prisons, a non-fiction work based on his experiences during his fifteen-month incarceration. It quickly became a bestseller and remained popular for the next twenty years.

In 1884, he relocated from Toledo to Washington, D.C. to become editor and co-owner of the newspaper National Tribune. He was active in the local Grand Army of the Republic, serving as commander of the Department of the Potomac during 1896. In 1908, McElroy published The Economic Functions of Vice. The next year, he published Struggle for Missouri, a history of the controversy concerning slavery that  resulted in armed conflict in Missouri. In 1910, he published a Civil War novel entitled Si Klegg: His Transformation from a Raw Recruit to a Veteran.

References

 McElroy, Rev. John McConnell, The Scotch-Irish McElroys in America: A. D. 1717-A. D. 1900. Albany, New York: Brandow Printing Company, 1901.

External links

 
 
 McElroy

1846 births
1929 deaths
20th-century American novelists
American Civil War prisoners of war
American male novelists
American military writers
People of Illinois in the American Civil War
People from Greenup County, Kentucky
Writers from Toledo, Ohio
Union Army soldiers
Novelists from Kentucky
20th-century American male writers
Novelists from Ohio
20th-century American non-fiction writers
American male non-fiction writers
Grand Army of the Republic officials